Stenoma icteropis is a moth of the family Depressariidae. It is found in Pará, Brazil.

The wingspan is 13–14 mm. The forewings are pale violet grey, sometimes suffused whitish ochreous and with a short yellow-ochreous mark from the middle of the base. There is a slender yellow-ochreous costal streak from the base to about the middle and a suffused ochreous-whitish bar on the end of the cell. The hindwings are light grey.

References

Moths described in 1925
Taxa named by Edward Meyrick
Stenoma